Punk Wedding is the second extended play by German singer Nina Hagen. The German version Punkhochzeit was first released in 1987 by Metropol Records and the English version was released in 1988 by Amok Records. The EP celebrates Hagen's marriage to an 18-year-old South African punk named Iroquois. It is also her first independent release since the expiration of her recording deal with Columbia Records. The German version of the EP was labeled "Banned from East Berlin".

Background
After her recording contract with Columbia Records expired in 1986, Hagen kept on performing and releasing music independently. In 1987, she caught the attention of the media by announcing her marriage to an 18-year-old South African punk named Iroquois, whom she met in Rome in 1985.  The song "Punk Wedding" was written for the wedding and Hagen described the event as a marriage between the punk and new age movements. The wedding was scheduled on August 9, 1987. When asked about having any apprehensions about marrying someone barely half her age, Hagen replied: 
In 1995, when Hagen married Gordon Polk, the lead singer of the punk rock band FiFi, she claimed it was her first wedding and the previous wedding with Iroquois was "just for fun" and not real.

Track listing

Personnel
Nina Hagen – vocals
Jens Kuphal – keyboards
Jürgen Dehmel – bass
Billy Liesegang – guitar
Peter Krause – drums

References

External links 

1987 EPs
1988 EPs
Nina Hagen albums